The 1944 Wake Forest Demon Deacons football team was an American football team that represented Wake Forest University during the 1944 college football season. In its eighth season under head coach Peahead Walker, the team compiled an 8–1 record and finished in second place in the Southern Conference.

Schedule

References

Wake Forest
Wake Forest Demon Deacons football seasons
Wake Forest Demon Deacons football